Amanda Velenosi (born June 16, 1992) is a Canadian former pair skater. With partner Mark Fernandez, she is the 2007 Canadian national junior silver medalist and placed as high as 6th at the World Junior Championships (2007).

Career 
Velenosi teamed up with Fernandez in 2006. They won a bronze medal on the 2006 ISU Junior Grand Prix circuit in Oslo, Norway. The pair won silver on the junior level at the 2007 Canadian Championships and were assigned to the 2007 World Junior Championships where they placed 6th.

In the 2007–08 season, Velenosi / Fernandez won silver at their JGP event in Tallinn, Estonia and placed 5th in Sheffield. The pair qualified for the ISU Junior Grand Prix Final where they initially placed 5th. They later moved up a spot to fourth as a result of the retroactive disqualification of gold medalists Vera Bazarova / Yuri Larionov due to a positive doping sample from Larionov. Velenosi / Fernandez placed 10th on the senior level at the 2008 Canadian Championships. She also competed in the junior ladies' event, winning the bronze medal. The pair finished 9th at the 2008 World Junior Championships.

In 2008–09, Velenosi / Fernandez placed 5th and 9th in their two JGP events. They were also assigned to one senior Grand Prix event, the 2008 Cup of Russia, where they finished 7th. The pair ended their career after placing 10th at the 2009 Canadian Championships.

Programs 
(with Fernandez)

Results

Pair skating with Fernandez

Single skating

References

External links

 

Canadian female pair skaters
Living people
Figure skaters from Montreal
1992 births